Diceratherium (meaning "two horned beast") is an extinct genus of rhinoceros endemic to North America, Europe, and Asia during the Oligocene through Miocene living from 33.9 to 11.6 mya, existing for approximately . Mass estimates for the type species, D. armatum average around

Taxonomy
 
 
Diceratherium was named by Marsh (1875). It is not extant. Its type is Diceratherium armatum. It was assigned to Rhinocerotidae by Marsh (1875) and Carroll (1988); to Diceratheriinae by Prothero (1998); to Aceratheriinae by Weidmann and Ginsburg (1999); and to Teleoceratini by Sach and Heizmann (2001). 
Diceratherium had two horns side by side on its nose. It lived during the Miocene Epoch.

References

Serravallian genus extinctions
Oligocene mammals of North America
Cenozoic mammals of Europe
Cenozoic mammals of Asia
Oligocene rhinoceroses
White River Fauna
Chattian genus first appearances
Miocene rhinoceroses
Fossil taxa described in 1875